You're My Pet is a 2011 South Korean romantic comedy film based on the manga Tramps Like Us (known in Japanese as You're My Pet) by . It co-stars Kim Ha-neul and Jang Keun-suk and directed by Kim Byeong-kon. It is released on 10 November 2011 by Lotte and ran at 110 minutes.

Cast
 Kim Ha-neul - Ji Eun-yi
 Jang Keun-suk - Kang In-ho
 Ryu Tae-joon - Cha Woo-seong
 Jeong Yu-mi - Lee Young-eun
 Kang Ha-neul - Young-soo
 Choi Jong-hoon - Ji Eun-soo
 Kang Hae-in - Kim Mi-sung
 Ko Woo-ri as Lee Min Sun

Plot
The film centers around a young and ambitious woman named Ji Eun-yi (Kim Ha-neul) and her human pet (Jang Keun-suk).

After her fiancé leaves her for his mistress and Ji Eun-yi is demoted at work, she stumbles across a young injured homeless man in a box outside her condominium. She takes him in and becomes attached to him. As a joke, she says she wants to keep him as a pet, and to her surprise, the young man agrees. She names him Momo, after her beloved dog from her childhood. Ji Eun-yi provides room and board, and Momo provides unconditional love and loyalty. Momo, whose name is Kang In-ho, is a dance child prodigy who gradually brings happiness to his master's life.

Despite his growing affection for her, Ji Eun-yi says there is no romance of any sort in their relationship. However, sexual tension gradually arises as the two spend more time together. But not only does Ji Eun-yi struggle with her feelings for the young guy, she also needs to keep him a secret from her co-workers, especially her former college classmate and new romantic interest Woo-seong.

Reception
In Korea, the film sold 209,318 tickets in the first five days, ranked fourth and grossed  in its first week of release and grossed a total closed to  after four weeks of screening.

In Japan, the film was released on 21 January 2012 by Toho. It ranked fifth and grossed  in its first week of release and grossed a total of  after three weeks on 92 screens.

References

External links 
  

2011 films
2011 romantic comedy films
South Korean romantic comedy films
Live-action films based on manga
Lotte Entertainment films
2010s Korean-language films
2010s South Korean films